This is a list of all Krush champions. Included are all champions who have won the title since the brands inauguration in 2009, as a collaboration of K-1 and AJKF. It is the sister brand of K-1.

Krush Cruiserweight Championship
Weight limit:

Krush Super Welterweight Championship
Weight limit:

Krush Welterweight Championship
Weight limit:

Krush Super Lightweight Championship
Weight limit:

Krush Lightweight Championship
Weight limit:

Krush Super Featherweight Championship
Weight limit:

Krush Featherweight Championship
Weight limit:

Krush Super Bantamweight Championship
Weight limit:

Krush Bantamweight Championship
Weight limit:

Krush Flyweight Championship
Weight limit:

Krush Women's Flyweight Championship
Weight limit:

Krush Women's Atomweight Championship
Weight limit:

Tournament winners

Grand Prix champions

Youth Grand Prix champions

Wildrush League champions

Records

Most wins in title bouts

Most consecutive title defenses

See also
 List of K-1 champions
 List of male kickboxers

References

K-1
Lists of sportspeople
Lists of kickboxers
Lists of martial artists